Justine Khainza also referred to as Khainza Justine (born 30 June 1982) is a Ugandan politician and social worker. She is the district woman representative of Bududa District in the 9th and 10th  Parliament of Uganda. She is a member of the National Resistance Movement political party. In the 2021 presidential and parliamentary elections, she lost the vote to Agnes Nandutu who is the current district woman representative of Bududa District in the 11th Parliament of Uganda.

Education 
In 1996, she sat for her Primary Leaving Examinations from Buckley High School. She received a Uganda Certificate of Education from Tororo Girls School in 2000. In 2002, she obtained a Uganda Advanced Certificate of Education from Ndejje S.S. In 2004, she got a Certificate in Leadership from Miracle Bible College. She graduated with bachelor's degree in Development Studies in 2006 from Makerere University.  In 2007, she obtained a Certificate in Administrative Officers Law Course from Law Development Centre, Kampala. Her Master of Public Health Leadership was awarded by Uganda Christian University, Mukono in 2014.

Career before politics 
In 2009, she worked as a trainee at the Civil Aviation Authority of Uganda. Between 2006 and 2008, she served as a Coordinator at Mt Elgon Christian Fellowship Association, Bududa.

Political career 
From 2011 to 2021, she served as the Member of the Parliament in the  ninth and tenth Parliament of Uganda. In 2020, she was validated by National Resistance Movement Elections Tribunals after winning in the pre-elections.

Other responsibilities 
She served on the Budget Committee and Committee on Agriculture at the Parliament of Uganda.

Personal life 
She is married. Her hobbies are reading, games, and traveling. She has special interest in public health awareness campaign, mobilization of women and youths for economic empowerment, and promoting sports among the youths.

See also 

 List of members of the tenth Parliament of Uganda
 List of members of the ninth Parliament of Uganda
 National Resistance Movement
 Agnes Nandutu
 Parliament of Uganda
 Member of Parliament
 Bududa District

External links 

 Website of the Parliament of Uganda
 Khainza Justine on Facebook

References 

1982 births
Living people
People from Bududa District
Makerere University alumni
Uganda Christian University alumni
Members of the Parliament of Uganda
Women members of the Parliament of Uganda
National Resistance Movement politicians